Sal Rei is a city on the northwestern coast of the island of Boa Vista in eastern Cape Verde. Sal Rei is the island's main urban settlement, and the seat of the Boa Vista Municipality. In 2010 its population was 5,778. The name of the settlement means "Salt King" in Portuguese. This name stems from when the island's main industry was salt production.

Sal Rei has a port on the bay with ferry routes to the islands of Santiago (Praia), Sal (Santa Maria) and Maio (Cidade do Maio). A new quay was built in 2015. West of the port lies the small islet of Ilhéu de Sal Rei. Tourism is concentrated on the area of Praia de Cabral.

History

The town was founded in the saltpans of Boa Vista. In 1815 and 1817, the town was sacked by pirates. Forte Duque de Bragança was built on the nearby island Ilhéu de Sal Rei to defend the town from further pirate attacks.

Population

Climate
Sal Rei is in a desert climate zone as does the rest of the island. The coldest month is February which averages  and the warmest is September which averages .

Notable people
Aristides Raimundo Lima, president of the National Assembly from 2001 to 2011.

See also
List of cities and towns in Cape Verde
Tourism in Cape Verde

References

 
Cities in Cape Verde
Municipal seats in Cape Verde
Populated coastal places in Cape Verde
Geography of Boa Vista, Cape Verde
Economy of Cape Verde
Ports and harbours of Cape Verde